Providence College of Engineering Chengannur (established in 2015), commonly known as PRC, is an engineering institute in the state of Kerala, India. It is managed under MGM Charitable trust in Chengannur. The college is affiliated to A P J Abdul Kalam Technological University and All India Council for Technical Education.

References

Engineering colleges in Kerala
All India Council for Technical Education
Universities and colleges in Alappuzha district